Qatalum is an aluminium smelter plant located in Mesaieed Industrial Area that is a joint venture between QatarEnergy and Norsk Hydro. ABB Group was awarded with a $140 million contract by Qatalum in 2007 to construct the electrical parts of the plant.

Inaugurated in April 2010, it was the largest aluminium plant ever launched in one step. Its annual capacity in September 2011 was 585,000 metric tons of primary aluminium, all to be shipped as value added aluminium casthouse products. A 1350 MW natural gas power plant has also been built to ensure a stable supply of electricity.

See also
Norway–Qatar relations

References

External links
Qatalum Official Website 
QatarEnergy Official Website
Hydro Official Website

Aluminium companies of Qatar
2010 establishments in Qatar